The Grande Arche Congress was the fourteenth national congress of the French Socialist Party (Parti socialiste or PS). It took place from 13 to 15 December 1991. The Congress marked a return to calm after the chaotic Rennes Congress.

Results

Laurent Fabius was elected as First Secretary.

References

Congresses of the Socialist Party (France)
1991 in France
1991 in politics
1991 conferences